Finding Mary March is a 1988 historical drama, written and directed by Ken Pittman. This film discusses the search for the last remains of Demasduit (Mary March), one of the last of the Beothuk Indians, set in the Red Indian Lake area of Central Newfoundland. A young girl, Bernadette Buchans, believes that she is related to Mary March. Throughout the whole film, Bernadette and her father Ted are searching for the grave of her mother. An archaeologist/ photographer, Nancy George, accompanies them and she also believes that she has family connections to the Beothuk Indians.

Plotline 
Nancy George, a new character, is accompanied by some big city folk while flying in a helicopter. They discuss Nancy’s purpose of coming to town and her desire to photograph Beothuk burial sites. Nancy notifies the others of her belief that there are still some important archeological remains in the place and that a mine should not be opened in risk of destroying the lost heritage of the Beothuk. Next, we are introduced to Ted and Bernadette as they canoe along the river, a tourist discovers an arrowhead along the shore as Ted notices this he aims his rifle at him, he drops the arrow head and quickly runs into the woods. They continue to row along the river.

The next morning Nancy wakes to find Bernadette has taken the piece of pendant and broken the board from the Indian boy. Nancy tells Ted that Bernadette has taken it. Ted becomes very angry and asks Nancy if she would "let someone open [her] mother’s coffin and take her wedding ring." Nancy tells him she did it to understand, explaining the relation of Mi'Kmaq and Beothuk written language. Nancy believes this may be the lost key of the written language of the Beothuk. Ted leaves without saying anything.

Nancy gets aboard the helicopter and Ted asks her where she is going from here, she says she is going to get a new lens and is going to come back and finish what she started. Ted tells her he will finish it too.  The helicopter leaves and Ted and Bernadette rebury Mary March.

Cast

Main cast 

Richard Boland - Ted Buchans
Jacinta Cormier - Mary March
Yvon Joe - Micmac Boy
Tara Manual - Bernadette Buchans
Andrée Pelletier - Nancy George

Production crew

Producers 

John Harris - Executive Producer
Stirling Norris - Executive Producer
Ken Pittman - Producer

Original music 

Pamela Morgan
Paul Steffler

Cinematography 

Michael Jones

Film editing 

Derek Norman

Reception 

Finding Mary March was released on August 31st 1988, being played on select theatres and film festivals across Canada. Though not gaining much of a following or popularity, the film was success among certain Canadian film critics and received good reviews. Canadian film critic Patrick Keans gave the film a lengthy and positive review in film review newspaper Cinema Canada. Keans calls Finding Mary March a spiritual film saying,
"(Director) Pittman’s attempts to answer compelling questions about how we act integrate many ways of knowing and we can’t help but know a little more after watching and listening to Finding Mary March"

References 

1. Marsan, Rachelle. "Finding Mary March and other things along the way." The Newfoundland Herald 15 Aug. 1987: 22-23. Print.

2. Sullivan, Joan. "Ken Pittman: ‘Finding Mary March’." The Newfoundland Herald 30 Aug. 1986: 18-19. Print.

3. Wade, James. "Finding Mary March." Newfoundland Lifestyle Nov.-Dec. 1988: 42. Print.

4. Finding Mary March. Dir. Ken Pittman. Perf. Andree Pelletier, Rick Boland, Tara Maria Manual, Joe Yvon, Jacinta Cormier.. Canadian Broadcasting Company, 1988. Film.

5. Pittman, Ken. "Finding Mary March." Cinema Canada Jan 1989, 91. Print.

External links 
Finding Mary March at the Centre for Newfoundland Studies

Canadian drama films
1988 films
1980s Canadian films